The Book of Kells is a progressive rock album by Iona. Released in 1992.
The Book of Kells, an 8th-century manuscript filled with lush pictures illustrating the Gospels, possibly originating from the monastery at Iona, serves as the album's namesake.

Again the recording process moved round the country for suitable facilities:
Wildlife Studio, Ipswich - (Engineer Nigel Palmer)
Studio 2, Leeds - (Engineer Rob Price)
Kensington Temple Church - (Engineer Nigel Palmer) for the Heavenly Hosts

The recording was remastered for the 2002 release The River Flows: Anthology and later re-released on Open Sky Records as a standalone album.


Personnel

Band
 Joanne Hogg - Vocals, Keyboards
 Dave Bainbridge - Keyboards, Guitar, Chimes
 Nick Beggs - Chapman stick, Bass guitar, Small Cymbals
 Terl Bryant - Drums, Percussion
 Dave Fitzgerald - Saxophone, Flageolets, Flute, Piccolo, Chinese Flutes, Dizi, Suona

Additional musicians and special guests
Frank van Essen - Drums, Percussion, Violin
Troy Donockley - Uilleann pipes, Low Whistles
Fiona Davidson - Celtic Harp
Peter Whitfield - Ensemble Violins, Viola
Kensington Temple Church congregation - Heavenly Hosts

Track listing
Disc - Total Time 72:21
Kells Opening Theme  – 4:18
Revelation  – 4:38
Mathew-The Man  – 11:54
Chi-Rho  – 4:39
Mark-The Lion  – 3:29
The River Flows  – 5:01
Luke-The Calf  – 4:03
Virgin and Child  – 3:16
Temptation  – 4:34
The Arrest-Gethsemane  – 3:49
Trinity-The Godhead  – 6:09
John-The Eagle  – 4:15
Kells  – 5:29
Eternity-No Beginning No End  – 6:47

Release details
1992, UK, What Records WHAR 1287, Release Date ? ? 1992, LP
1992, UK, What Records WHAD 1287, Release Date ? ? 1992, CD
1992, UK, What Records WHAC 1287, Release Date ? ? 1992, Cassette
1992, USA, Forefront Records FFD-3001, Release Date ? ? 1992, CD
2003, UK, Open Sky Records OPENVP2CD, Release Date 3 November 2003, CD

Iona (band) albums
1992 albums
Word Records albums